Kelli Connell (born 1974) is an American contemporary photographer. Connell is known for creating portraits, which may appear as self-portraits. Her work is held in the collections of the Columbus Museum of Art, the Los Angeles County Museum of Art, the Museum of Fine Arts Houston, the Museum of Contemporary Photography and the Dallas Museum of Art.

Early life and education
Kelli Connell was born in 1974 in Oklahoma City, Oklahoma.> Connell took her first photography class as a junior in high school, and was influenced early on by the work of Roni Horn, Francesca Woodman, and Larry Sultan. She received her BFA in Photography and Visual Arts Studies at the University of North Texas. In 2003, Connell received her Masters in Fine Arts in Photography and a minor in Art history from Texas Woman’s University.

Artistic career
Connell became a photographer to explore how photography can raise questions. In 2011, Decode Books released her first monograph, Double Life, in which she presented 36 color photographs of two young women occupied in their day to day activities of pleasure and reflection. Double Life seeks to question ideas of identity, gender roles, and expectations made by society on the individual. The series, which depicts a woman in a romantic relationship with herself, shows the "couple" having intimate and private moments in their lives. Connell uses her art to define the multiple sides of the self in the overall human experience. The portraits are also a case of identity. Connell worked with the same model over a series of years to produce the work.

She is currently a professor at Columbia College Chicago.

Collections

Columbus Museum of Art
Dallas Museum of Art
Los Angeles County Museum of Art
"Carnival", 2006, Metropolitan Museum of Art, New York City
Museum of Contemporary Photography
Museum of Fine Arts Houston

Exhibitions

Double Life, Columbus Museum of Art, Columbus, Ohio, 2004
Kelli Connell: Photographs, Kendall College of Art and Design, Ferris State University, Grand Rapids, Michigan, 2009

Publications
Double Life. Seattle: Decode 2011. With Susan Bright. .

Personal life
Connell is married to sculptor Betsy Odom.

References

External links

1974 births
American contemporary artists
Photographers from Oklahoma
Columbia College Chicago faculty
Artists from Oklahoma City
University of North Texas alumni
American women photographers
Living people
American lesbian artists
American women academics
LGBT people from Oklahoma
21st-century American photographers
21st-century American women artists